James I Land is a land area on the northwestern part of Spitsbergen, Svalbard. It is named after King James I of England and Scotland. The 30 kilometer long glacier Sveabreen divides James I Land from Oscar II Land.

References

Geography of Svalbard
Spitsbergen